Ikhtiyar Shirinov (1952 – 15 November 2022) was an Azerbaijani lawyer and politician. A member of Musavat, he served as Prosecutor General from 1992 to 1993.

Shirinov died on 15 November 2022.

References

1952 births
2022 deaths
People from Beylagan District
Musavat politicians
Baku State University alumni
Azerbaijani lawyers
Prosecutors General of Azerbaijan
Azerbaijani politicians